Fred Perry (born January 5, 1975) was a Canadian football defensive end. Perry most recently played for the Winnipeg Blue Bombers where his success was limited due to injury.

College career
Perry attended Southern Arkansas University and played two seasons of football. As a senior, he helped in leading his team to the 1997 Gulf South Conference Championship and was named an NCAA Division II All-American. He previously attended Northeastern Oklahoma College.

Professional career
The bulk of Perry's playing career has been in the CFL, though he spent the entire 2002 season on the injured reserve of the NFL's Atlanta Falcons after being injured in an exhibition game.

In 2006, Perry was second in the CFL in quarterback sacks and was named to the CFL All-Star team. He repeated as an All-Star in 2007 and won the 95th Grey Cup with the Saskatchewan Roughriders.

On February 8, 2008, he was traded, along with Saskatchewan's 2008 2nd round CFL Draft choice, to the Edmonton Eskimos. In exchange, the Riders received Steven Jyles and Edmonton's 2008 2nd round draft choice. It was reported that, after re-signing with the Roughriders shortly after the Grey Cup, Perry had repeatedly asked for a signing bonus or cash advance that general manager Eric Tillman could not provide for salary cap reasons.

In 2008, Perry saw action in only seven games with the Eskimos, managing just one sack.

On May 15, 2009, Perry was traded from the Edmonton Eskimos to the Winnipeg Blue Bombers for DB Kelly Malveaux.

On March 19, 2010, Perry was released by the Winnipeg Blue Bombers.

Notes 

1975 births
Canadian football defensive linemen
Toronto Argonauts players
Edmonton Elks players
Living people
Sportspeople from Fort Smith, Arkansas
Saskatchewan Roughriders players
Southern Arkansas Muleriders football players
Winnipeg Blue Bombers players
Birmingham Thunderbolts players
Players of American football from Arkansas